13th District (Hungarian: XIII. kerület) is the 13th district of Budapest, Hungary. The main parts are Angyalföld, Népsziget, Újlipótváros and Vizafogó (and until 2013 Margaret Island).

List of mayors

Twin towns – sister cities
13th district is twinned with:
 Floridsdorf (Vienna), Austria
 Košice-Juh (Košice), Slovakia
 Ochota (Warsaw), Poland
 Osijek, Croatia
 Sovata, Romania

Notes

References

External links